Several ships of the Royal Navy have been named HMS Pyramus, after the doomed lover from the writings of Ovid.

 was a fifth rate 36-gun frigate built in Portsmouth and hulked in 1832-33 at Halifax, Nova Scotia, sold and broken up in 1879. The information that the ship had been captured by Lord Nelson at the Battle of Copenhagen in 1801 is incorrect. (Source Dr. Ian A. Cameron, M.D, F.C.F.P., Nova Scotia Medical Bulletin, August 1987, pp. 118–120; Also, the Cambridge Digital Library / University of Cambridge website)
 was a  protected cruiser launched in 1897, and sold in 1920.

Royal Navy ship names